Góra Kalwaria ("Calvary Mountain", Ger) is a town on the Vistula River in the Masovian Voivodeship, in east-central Poland. The town has strong religious significance for both Catholic Christians and Hasidic Jews of the Ger dynasty.

History 

The village of Góra already existed in the 13th century. It was a private village of Polish nobility, administratively located in the Czersk County in the Masovian Voivodeship in the Greater Poland Province of the Polish Crown. Completely destroyed during a Swedish occupation known as the Deluge, in 1666, it became the property of Stefan Wierzbowski, Bishop of Poznań, who decided to found a new town on the ruins. His plan was to build a calvary — a religious center dedicated to passion plays and services, which was popular in the early modern Poland. He was encouraged by the fact that the local landscape resembled that of the Holy Land.

In 1670, the town was renamed Nowa Jerozolima, granted city rights and construction work kicked off. The urban design was based on medieval maps of Jerusalem, and the street grid formed a Latin cross. The bishop invited Dominican, Bernardine and Piarist orders to settle in the town, which soon became dotted with monasteries, churches, chapels and passion paths (such as stations of the Cross). The town was supposed to be a purely Christian one and Jews were not allowed to settle there.

After Bishop Wierzbowski's death the decline of the town began. Many churches and chapels were pulled down, and in the years 1883–1919 the town was deprived of city rights.

In the early 19th century, the ban on Jewish settlement was lifted and afterwards Jews became the predominant group in the town, also due to their expulsion from Russia (see Pale of Settlement). Góra Kalwaria then became one of the major centers of Hasidic Judaism and home to the Ger dynasty.

During World War I, Góra Kalwaria was occupied by Germany. On November 11, 1918, the day Poland regained independence, local Polish firefighters led by Szymon Adamiec disarmed the German troops without a fight and liberated the town.

In 1919, during the Polish–Soviet War, several Polish horse artillery squadrons were formed in the town. On August 13–14, 1920, Poles successfully defended the town from the invading Russians. During the Battle of Warsaw (1920), a hospital for wounded Polish troops was organized in Góra Kalwaria. To commemorate the Polish victory, Marshal Józef Piłsudski awarded 133 Polish artillerymen with the Virtuti Militari in a ceremony held in the town in August 1921. In the interbellum, the Polish Border Guard Main School was located in the town until 1933, and then the 1st Heavy Artillery Regiment was stationed there.

Following the joint German-Soviet invasion of Poland, which started World War II in September 1939, the town was occupied by Germany. 23 Polish policemen from the town and officers from the local garrison were murdered by the Russians in the large Katyn massacre in April–May 1940. During the Holocaust, the Jewish population of the town was first concentrated in a small ghetto. In 1942, it was transferred to the Warsaw Ghetto and from there to the Treblinka extermination camp. In 1945, the town was restored to Poland, although with a Soviet-installed communist regime, which then stayed in power until the Fall of Communism in the 1980s. After the Fall of Communism, pre-war monuments dedicated to Marshal Józef Piłsudski and the Polish heroes of the Polish–Soviet War were restored.

Transport

The Polish National roads No. 50 and 79 and the Polish railway line No. 12 (Skierniewice—Łuków) bypass the town. There is an inland port on the Vistula river in Góra Kalwaria.

Sports
The main sports club of the town is Korona Góra Kalwaria with football, boxing and chess sections.

People 
Rebbes of Ger (Alter family)
Yitzchak Meir Alter
 Yehudah Aryeh Leib Alter
 Avraham Mordechai Alter
Yisrael Alter
Simchah Bunim Alter
Pinchas Menachem Alter
 Pinchas Menachem Justman, The Piltzer Rebbe
 Dov Berish Einhorn, The Amstover Rav
 Józef Chaciński, politician and lawyer
 Yitzhak-Meir Levin, member of the Sejm and signatory of the Israeli declaration of independence
 Wolf Messing, a mentalist
 Yankel Talmud (1885-1965), Ger court composer

See also 
 Kalwaria Zebrzydowska
 Battle of Warsaw (1920)
 Battle of Radzymin (1944)

References

External links 

 Miasto i gmina Góra Kalwaria
 Jewish Community in Góra Kalwaria on Virtual Shtetl
 

 
Piaseczno County
Cities and towns in Masovian Voivodeship
Masovia
Masovian Voivodeship (1526–1795)
Warsaw Governorate
Warsaw Voivodeship (1919–1939)
Holocaust locations in Poland
Historic Jewish communities in Poland